Just a Pretty Face? is the third studio album by Finnish singer Anna Abreu, released in Finland by RCA on October 21, 2009. The album was preceded by the lead single "Music Everywhere" and followed by the promotional singles "Impatient" and "Slam".

The album was primarily produced by Abreu's long-time collaborator Rauli Eskolin, who had been responsible for the success of her previous, dance-infused album Now. It was the first of Abreu's albums to feature the rap genre, with the song "Capital C" featuring a rap segment. In its first day of release alone, the album sold 23,000 copies and was certified gold, becoming one of the fastest selling records in Finnish music history. Ordinarily, the album would have reached number one in its first week. However, the same week also saw the release of two other high-profile albums and as a result, Just A Pretty Face? debuted at number three on the Finnish albums chart.

Commercial performance
Just a Pretty Face? debuted at number three on the Finnish Top 40 albums chart, a position it held for three weeks. In its seventh week, it reached its chart peak of number two. In its first day of release alone, the album sold 23,000. To date it has sold over 30,000 copies, becoming Abreu's third consecutive platinum album.

Chart performance

Singles
 "Music Everywhere", the lead single from the album debuted at number 4 on the Finnish singles chart, peaking at number 2 after Abreu's live performance of the song at the Finnish Children In Need event. It became Abreu's third top five hit following "End of Love" from her self-titled debut album and "Vinegar", the number 1 smash hit from her 2008 album Now. The song also reached number six on the Digital Download chart and number four on the Airplay Chart.
 "Impatient", the album's second single, was released to radio stations on November 9, 2009. Although accompanied by a music video, the single was used only to promote the album and therefore did not impact the singles chart. It still received good radio airplay and charted at number twenty-one on the Airplay Chart.
 "Slam", became the album's third single on February 22, 2010, and like its predecessor, was also only released as a promotional single. However, Abreu did perform the song live on the first series of the X Factor in 2010.

Track listing

Promotion

From 2009 to 2010, Abreu promoted her third album with the Just a Pretty Face? Tour throughout Finland. Her Walking On Water show, which was a one-off held aboard the M/S Silja Symphony in Helsinki was also used to promote the album.

Setlist

Tour dates

References

2009 albums
Anna Abreu albums